"The Real Housewives of Fat Tony" is the nineteenth episode of the twenty-second season of the American animated television series The Simpsons. It first aired on the Fox network in the United States on May 1, 2011. This episode mainly centers around Marge Simpson and one of her older sisters, Selma, who falls in love with mobster Fat Tony II. Selma later begins the glamorous lifestyle associated with being in the Mafia and the couple agrees to marry each other. The marriage leads to tension between Marge and Selma. Fat Tony later invites Homer and Marge to his mansion in New Jersey, in hopes of mending the sisters' relationship. Meanwhile, Bart acquires an ability to trace the location of truffles, which leads Lisa to attest to her growing greed for eating truffles.

This episode was written by Dick Blasucci, and directed by Lance Kramer. The episode was met with a mixed to negative response from television critics, with much criticism going to the cultural references and the main storyline. It garnered a 2.9 rating in the 18-49 demographic. The episode featured a guest appearance from Joe Mantegna, as well as several recurring voice actors and actresses for the series.

Plot
Selma is greeted by Fat Tony (formerly Fit Tony from "Donnie Fatso" following the death of the original Fat Tony) at the DMV, much to her discontent. She makes several sarcastic remarks towards Fat Tony and refuses to let him submit a change of address (initially due to him submitting the wrong form, and then refusing to let him hold his position while he retrieves the correct form), enraging him in the process. This prompts him to order his local mafia to abduct and kidnap her. They set her up for interrogation at an abandoned warehouse, in which she shoots out more sarcastic remarks, and when asked which body part she wants cut off first, requests liposuction. Fat Tony falls in love with her humor and grants her request. Afterwards, the couple begin a romantic relationship and on a boat off the coast of New Jersey, Fat Tony proposes to Selma. She agrees to the proposal, and they end up getting married.

During the wedding reception, tension rises between Marge and Selma after the couple place Homer and his family in an undesirable location and Marge angrily admits to Selma that she was never sure about her marriage. To offer his apologies, Fat Tony later invites the Simpson family to his mansion over on the shore of New Jersey. After meeting a few relatives, the couples spend time together. While on the beach at dusk, Selma reveals to Marge that she was envious that she was not in a happy marriage, and asks for Marge's support of her marriage. Later, Marge and Homer overhear Fat Tony talking about a comare and conclude that he is cheating on her with another woman, so they tell Selma about this. Selma confronts Fat Tony about the claims, just as another woman abruptly crashes into his yard, claiming to be his real wife, with a ring with a larger diamond on it than Selma's. Fat Tony then confesses to Selma that he initially proposed to her to be his comare and their wedding ceremony reflected such intents. Selma declares that she is done trying to settle down with the right man, just before being insulted by Fat Tony's wife. This triggers into a full-blown fight between the ladies, while Homer sneaks off with Marge, admitting that she was right all along, and they make out in the tanning machine.

Meanwhile, Bart and Lisa are walking in the forest when Bart sniffs out a truffle. After she explains to him that truffles are prized gourmet foods, Bart finds another and both realize he can find them by smell. After talking with Luigi about the truffles for Luigi restaurant where he offers to pay them for any more truffles found, Lisa then uses Bart to find more truffles. Eventually, when they cannot find truffles, Lisa blinds Bart in order to keep him focused. He ends up sniffing out a truffle in Lisa's bedroom. Instead of selling them as planned before, Lisa has been eating them, bored by her own vegetarian food. They feel sorry for Luigi's pig, Plopper, who did not get to eat any, so give him the last one that Lisa had. The pig then proves this was a bad idea by going berserk and tearing through Luigi's restaurant to eat more of them.

Production

"The Real Housewives of Fat Tony" first aired on May 1, 2011 in the United States. This episode was directed by Lance Kramer who last directed a Simpsons episode in the season twenty-one episode, "To Surveil with Love". It was written by Dick Blasucci, in his first episode of the series.

This episode featured a guest appearances from Joe Mantegna, as well as several recurring voice actors and actresses for the series. Mantegna reprised his role as Fat Tony, in his second appearance in the season as the first was in the episode "Donnie Fatso". Alongside her role as Marge, Julie Kavner provided the voices for Patty and Selma Bouvier.

Reception

The episode was first broadcast on May 1, 2011, and it was viewed by 6.109 million viewers upon its original airing. While this episode achieved a 2.9 rating in the 18-49 demographic, according to the Nielson ratings. The episode's total viewership and ratings were significantly up from the previous episode, "The Great Simpsina", which was viewed by 4.996 million viewers upon its initial airing, and garnered a 2.3 rating in the 18-49 demographic. The episode was also preempted in several regions on the west coast due to breaking news coverage of the death of Osama bin Laden.

The episode was met with a mixed to negative response from television critics. Ariel Ponywether of Firefox News Ponywether's review was mixed not positive, she was quite negative about the sub-plot. She felt that it was a decent episode, noting that it was "funny, but not that much." Ponywether ultimately gave the episode a 'B+' grade. Eric Hochberger of TV Line gave it a 2.5 out of 5 stars, as he gave much criticism to the main plot of the episode. He deemed it as a "mediocre version of Jersey Shore". Hochberger also expressed discontentment for the sub-plot of the episode, stating that it "didn't tie in at all with the main storyline." In his review for this episode, he harshly criticized the jokes featured in the episode. He opined: "While I'm usually a fan of the mob boss jokes that Fat Tony appearances bring, they've pretty much been beaten to death by this show. Plus, this has been the second weak Fat Tony episode this season after the terrible "Donnie Fatso".  Maybe it's time to retire this character from headlining episodes until the writers come up with a story worthy of telling." Simon Abrams of The A.V. Club reacted negatively to the episode, giving it a 'C' grade. He criticized the writer's capabilities of writing as in his opinion, that they are not funny. However, Abrams was more positive on the subplot, saying that it was decent.

References

External links 
 

2011 American television episodes
The Simpsons (season 22) episodes
Television episodes about weddings